Codex Bodmer III, is a Coptic uncial manuscript of the fourth Gospel, and the first four chapters of Genesis, dated palaeographically to the 4th century. It contains the text of the Gospel of John with some lacunae. It is written in an early Bohairic dialect of Coptic language. 

It is the oldest manuscript of the Bohairic version. Originally codex contained 239 pages, but the first 22 are damaged and only small fragments have survived. The Gospel of John is followed by the text of Book of Genesis (1:1-4:2) with page numbers beginning with α in a new series. 

The first occurrence of "God" in John 1:1 is in contracted form as the Nomina Sacra, whereas the second occurrence is 
spelled fully. In John 1:18 the word "God" (which no one has seen) is contracted (as the Nomina Sacra), while the word "God" (only-begotten) is spelled out. The scribe may have been a Gnostic.

The text of the codex is a representative of the Alexandrian text-type. Because its text is different from later Bohairic manuscript (from 12th century and later) it was called to be the proto-Bohairic version (Papyrus Bodmer III). 

The manuscript was discovered in Upper Egypt and purchased by John M. Bodmer of Geneva.

It was published by Rodolphe Kasser in 1958.

Currently it is housed at the Bibliotheca Bodmeriana (P. Bodmer III) in Cologny.

See also 

 List of the Coptic New Testament manuscripts
 Coptic versions of the Bible
 Biblical manuscript

References

Further reading 

 Rodolphe Kasser, Papyrus Bodmer III. Evangile de Jean et Genese I-IV, 2 en bohairique, (CSCO clxxvii, Scriptores coptici, XXV; Louvain, 1958). 
 Papyrus Bodmer III: An Early Coptic Version of the Gospel of John and Genesis 1-4:2, ed. by Daniel B. Sharp. (Arbeiten zur neutestamentlichen Textforschung 48). Berlin/Boston, de Gruyter 2016. 

Coptic New Testament manuscripts
4th-century biblical manuscripts